Jade Eagleson (born May 23, 1994) is a Canadian country singer and songwriter from Bailieboro, Ontario. He has released eight singles (including the #1 Canada Country hits "Lucky", "All Night to Figure It Out", "More Drinkin' Than Fishin'" and "She Don't Know") and two albums Jade Eagleson and Honkytonk Revival.

Early life
Eagleson was born and raised on his grandparents's farm in Bailieboro, Ontario. He tended crops and raised livestock with his father before initially heading to Alberta for work at age 19. He then elected to move back to Bailieboro and pursue a career in country music. Eagleson cites Paul Brandt as one of his biggest musical influences, while also viewing Alan Jackson, Randy Travis, George Strait, and Shania Twain as major idols.

Career

2017–2020: Early career and self-titled album
In 2017, Eagleson won the Emerging Artist Showcase at the Boots and Hearts Music Festival. In May 2018, Eagleson released "Got Your Name on It", his debut single on Umusic. It would peak at #6 on the Billboard Canada Country chart and at #90 on the Canadian Hot 100. The song has been certified Platinum by Music Canada. Later that year, Eagleson released his debut self-titled extended play. The EP included Eagleson's second single "Count the Ways", which was also certified Gold by Music Canada and peaked at #4 on the Canada Country chart.

In October 2019, Eagleson released his third single "Lucky". Eagleson was then awarded "Rising Star" at the 2019 CCMA Awards. "Lucky" then became Eagleson's first #1 hit on the Canada Country chart in 2020. In April 2020, Eagleson released his fourth single "Close", which would peak at #8 on the Canada Country chart, and #88 on the Canadian Hot 100 (a new career high). His debut studio album Jade Eagleson was released on July 24, 2020 and included all four of his previous singles.

2021–present: Honkytonk Revival
In February 2021, Eagleson independently released the single "All Night to Figure It Out". It would become his second Number One Canada Country hit. Shortly after, he released the single "More Drinkin' Than Fishin'", a collaboration with fellow Canadian country artist Dean Brody. On November 12, 2021, Eagleson released his second studio album, Honkytonk Revival, which included "All Night to Figure It Out" and "More Drinkin' Than Fishin'" as well as the single "She Don't Know". As a result of each single off the album reaching number one, Eagleson joined Shania Twain as the only Canadian country artists to ever land three consecutive chart-toppers from their second studio album.

In August 2022, he released the single "Shakin' in Them Boots". At the 2022 Canadian Country Music Awards, Eagleson was awarded the Top Selling Canadian Album of the Year for Honkytonk Revival, and received six other nominations. In March 2023, he released the song "Rodeo Queen", which will be included on his upcoming third album set for release in the fall of 2023.

Personal life
Eagleson married his longtime girlfriend Marina Paquin in 2019. Later that year, Marina gave birth to their first child, a son. They currently live in Nashville, Tennessee. Eagleson met Paquin on the set of the music video for his debut single "Got Your Name on It". He considers himself a "proud Christian".

Discography

Albums

Extended plays

Singles

As lead artist

As featured artist

Music videos

Awards and nominations

References

External links

Living people
Canadian country singer-songwriters
Musicians from Ontario
21st-century Canadian male singers
People from Peterborough County
Universal Music Group artists
Canadian Country Music Association Rising Star Award winners
Canadian male singer-songwriters
1995 births